Hayatullah Khan (1976–2006) was a Pakistani journalist who reported from Pakistan's Federally Administered Tribal Areas. Khan wrote extensively on Al-Qaeda, Taliban and the heavy fighting among tribes in Waziristan, where he was found dead six months after his reporting contradicted Pakistan's official statements. He reported from the border between Pakistan and Afghanistan, which at the time was one of the most dangerous places in the world.

Career
Hayatullah Khan was a journalist for the Urdu-language daily Ausaf and his work was distributed through the European Pressphoto Agency. He took 14 hours of videotape for the PBS Frontline documentary Return of The Taliban (2002). He also worked as a fixer for foreign journalists, and according to Eliza Griswold, he could charge high fees because of the dangers in Waziristan and his strong work ethic and experience.

On 7 August 2001, the Committee to Protect Journalists wrote a letter to the Pakistan's President Gen. Pervez Musharraf after Hayatullah Khan had gone into hiding when the government threatened him with arrest because of his reports about skirmishes among tribes in Waziristan region.

Death
His dead body was discovered in June 2006, six months after he had been kidnapped by five unidentified gunmen on 5 December 2005, which his brother Haseenullah had witnessed.
According to the Daily Times one of the mysteries surrounding his death was that his kidnappers had kept him alive for all the months his whereabouts were unknown.

Just days before his kidnapping, the Pakistani authorities had said an al-Qaeda commander they named as Abu Hamza Rabia had been killed with four others in a blast at an alleged militant hideout in North Waziristan. The official version was that bomb-making materials had exploded by accident, but locals said the men were killed by a missile fired from an unmanned US drone. However, Khan took photographs of what appeared to be pieces of a US Hellfire missile at the scene. The pictures provoked angry protests in Pakistan at the infringement of Pakistani territory by US forces. While both the authorities and local militant groups denied any involvement in his killing, allegations persisted that Pakistan intelligence agencies were involved.

On 17 November 2007, Hayatullah's widow was murdered by a bomb that was detonated outside her home. Preliminary evidence indicates she was the target of the attack.
According to the Daily Times she been interview, that her husband had warned her "something" might happen to him, and had named individuals who would know why he had been killed.
Her death left their five young children orphaned.

Umar Cheema, writing for the Committee to Protect Journalists observed that while a judicial inquiry was conducted, it was never made public, and no police investigation ever took place.

Impact
Khan was the fifth, and most high-profile, journalist to be killed in Waziristan in two years, where working conditions for journalists are very hostile who face death threats from the Taliban and harassment from the military.

According to the Tribal Union of Journalists in Pakistan, the number of local journalist had diminished as a result of the dangers in Waziristan. As a result of his death, journalists went on strike and the Pakistan government began an investigation, but no report has ever been released.

See also
Frontier Crimes Regulations
Inter-Services Intelligence
List of Pakistani journalists

References

External links 
PBS Frontline Producers Dispatches from the Field
PBS Frontline Return of The Taliban (2002)
A Journalist of the Tribal Areas

1976 births
2006 deaths
Pashtun people
Pakistani male journalists
Assassinated Pakistani journalists
People murdered in Pakistan